Stanisław Pietkiewicz (1894–1986) was a Polish cartographer and geographer.

References

1894 births
1986 deaths
Polish cartographers
Polish geographers
Commanders of the Order of Polonia Restituta
20th-century geographers
20th-century cartographers